Japan Center is a high-rise building in the Innenstadt district of Frankfurt, Germany. The 115-meter-high office tower with 27 floors was completed in 1996.

Design and construction
The building was designed by Berlin architect Joachim Ganz and cost approximately 200 million Euros. It was completed in 1996. The strict geometric forms based on the measure of a Japanese tatami mat (0.9 m × 1.8 m) and terra cotta stone cladding correspond to classical Japanese design. Its wide roof reminisces the shape of a Japanese stone lantern. The building outline is square (36.9 m × 36.9 m). Its central core houses nine elevators, two emergency staircases and utility shafts. The facade features large and small square windows housing open plan and single offices respectively.

Interior
The ground floor is an arcade with shops and a Japanese restaurant. The 1st floor holds a multi-room conference center for up to 360 people. Utilities are housed in the 2nd floor followed by 21 office floors with a total area of 26,000 square meters. In the 25th floor, close to the roof, is another restaurant, which serves as a cafeteria and is used by a catering service as a venue. The topmost floors hold additional offices and utilities for the upper half of the building. The Japan Center office rooms are used by the European Central Bank.

Gallery

See also
 List of tallest buildings in Frankfurt
 List of tallest buildings in Germany

References

Office buildings completed in 1996
Skyscrapers in Frankfurt
Bankenviertel
Skyscraper office buildings in Germany